Away From The Sea is the debut studio album by French electro house artist, Yuksek. The album was released on 9 Feb 2009 through Barclay Records.

The first single from the album, "Tonight", was performed live in China and featured in the video produced by Peugeot for their 200-year anniversary.

The second single from the album, "Extraball", was used in an advert by the Lacoste clothing brand to release their "Red Label" line of clothing.

The hidden track of the album was composed by The Bewitched Hands. It consists in a rearranged and acoustic version of Tonight. This track is also used at the end of the video clip Tonight, where Yuksek takes part of a choir.

Reception
The album received average reviews, with the exception of Yuksek's collaboration with Philadelphian singer Amanda Blank, which is often described as the album's highlight. Jon Davies, of dailymusicguide, stated that "Spank Rock's Amanda Blank livens up the track with her irresistible flow while Yuksek backs her with outrageously filthy beats and a few riffs stolen from Daft Punk"; while tempering this was his view of the album as a whole, stating that "It's questionable why anyone would want to listen to this when you can hear Justice do this kind of thing infinitely better."
URB magazine were more positive, stating that "Away From The Sea is altogether an impressive effort that establishes Yuksek’s sound without hindering his creativity" and awarding the album 4 out of 5 stars.

Track listing

Personnel

 Yuksek – mixing, vocals
 Photography, Art Direction, Design – Anastasia Constantinescu, Laurent Fetis

References

2009 debut albums
Yuksek albums
Barclay (record label) albums
Cherrytree Records albums